At All Costs is a Nancy Drew and Hardy Boys Supermystery crossover novel, published in 1997.

Plot summary
Nancy and her friend, Allison Fernley, celebrate Thanksgiving at the University of Utah, but when Allison finds out that her boyfriend, Tyler Conklin, an environmental activist with some powerful enemies, has vanished mysteriously, Nancy vows to solve the mystery. Meanwhile, at the 2002 Winter Olympics in Salt Lake City, Tyler Conklin turns up as a member of an environmentalist consortium: Earth At All Costs. The Hardy boys investigate to see if eco-terrorism is behind the sabotage of sports venues, but uncover a more complicated motive involving greed, corruption, and lies.

References

External links
At All Costs at Fantastic Fiction
Supermystery series books

Supermystery
1997 American novels
1997 children's books
Fiction set in 2002
Novels set in Utah
2002 Winter Olympics
Olympic Games in fiction